Baleia is a mountain valley in the eastern part of the island of São Vicente. Its orientation is west-east, and it lies south of Baía das Gatas and northwest of the beach Praia Grande. At its western end is Monte Verde, the highest point of São Vicente. At its eastern end is the Atlantic Ocean. Access is either from the coast or from Mato Inglês over a mountain pass.

See also
 Geography of Cape Verde

References

Valleys of Cape Verde
Geography of São Vicente, Cape Verde